Yevgeniy Lomtyev (Russian: Евгений Ломтев; born 20 October 1961) is a retired Soviet sprinter who specialised in the 400 metres. He won the gold medal at the 1983 European Indoor Championships. In addition he won silver medals in the 4 × 400 metres relay at the 1983 and 1985 Summer Universiade.

His personal bests in the 400 metres are 45.05 seconds outdoors (Kiev 1984) and 46.20 seconds indoors (Budapest 1983).

International competitions

1Did not finish in the final

References

All-Athletics profile

1961 births
Living people
Russian male sprinters
Soviet male sprinters
World Athletics Championships athletes for the Soviet Union
Universiade medalists in athletics (track and field)
Universiade silver medalists for the Soviet Union
Medalists at the 1983 Summer Universiade
Competitors at the 1990 Goodwill Games
Friendship Games medalists in athletics